Dominion Tower is one of the distinctive and recognizable features of Downtown Norfolk, Virginia, United States. Once the tallest building in the Hampton Roads metro area, it is now the tallest building in the City of Norfolk, having been surpassed by the mid-2000s construction of the Armada Hoffler Tower and Westin Virginia Beach Town Center tower in neighboring Virginia Beach. The 26 story tower was named after the state of Virginia's nickname: "The Old Dominion". The tower's completion and opening took place in 1987. Today, various corporations have offices in the building.

In late 2016, Bank of America moved its regional headquarters and affixed its signage to the building, replacing the signage of Bank of Hampton Roads, which relocated its headquarters to Virginia Beach in 2012 but maintained a branch in the building.

See also 
List of tallest buildings in Norfolk, Virginia
List of tallest buildings in Virginia
Norfolk, Virginia

External links
 The Dominion Tower (official page)

References

Office buildings completed in 1987
Skyscraper office buildings in Norfolk, Virginia
Buildings and structures in Norfolk, Virginia
Office buildings in Norfolk, Virginia
Downtown Norfolk, Virginia

HKS, Inc. buildings